Millard Ruud (1917–1997) was executive director of the Association of American Law Schools.   A noted scholar of legislation and commercial law, Ruud graduated from the University of Minnesota and the University of Minnesota Law School, where he served as president of the Minnesota Law Review twice.  He also served as John S. Redditt Professor and associate dean of law at the University of Texas-Austin.   He was given an Outstanding Achievement Award by the University of Minnesota in 1980.

Personal life
Ruud was born in Minnesota, served in World War II, married, and died in Austin, Texas.

References 

University of Minnesota Law School alumni
American legal scholars
Texas lawyers
University of Texas at Austin faculty

1917 births
1997 deaths